Espahabdan (also Romanized as Espahabdān; also known as Esbābzel and Espābzel) is a village in Khorgam Rural District, Khorgam District, Rudbar County, Gilan Province, Iran. At the 2006 census, its population was 47, in 15 families.

References 

Populated places in Rudbar County